The Weavers at Carnegie Hall (1957) is the second album by the Weavers. The concert was recorded live at Carnegie Hall in New York City on Christmas Eve 1955. At the time the concert was a comeback for the group following the inclusion of the group on the entertainment industry blacklist. The album peaked at number 24 on the Billboard Top 200 in 1961.

The album represents the first half of that Carnegie Hall concert. A recording of the concert's second half was also released as an album, entitled The Weavers on Tour (1957, rereleased 1970).

Track listing 
 "Darling Corey" (Traditional, arranged by Gilbert, Hays, Hellerman) — 1:58
 "Kisses Sweeter than Wine" (traditional, arranged by Gilbert, Hays, Hellerman) — 3:14
 "Pay Me My Money Down" (Parrish) — 2:36
 "Greensleeves" (Traditional) — 2:39
 "Rock Island Line" (Lead Belly) — 2:19
 "Around the World" (Gilbert, Hays, Hellerman) — 2:37
 "Wimoweh" (Solomon Linda, arranged by Gilbert, Hays, Hellerman) — 1:46
 "Venga Jaleo" (Brooks) — 2:09
 "Suliram (I'll Be There)" (Campbell, Engvick) — 2:05
 "Shalom Chaverim" (Gilbert, Hays, Hellerman) — 2:02
 "Lonesome Traveler" (Hays) — 1:59
 "I Know Where I'm Going" (Traditional, arranged by Gilbert, Hays, Hellerman) — 1:51
 "Woody's Rag/900 Miles" (Woody Guthrie) — 1:34
 "Sixteen Tons" (Merle Travis) — 2:03
 "Follow the Drinking Gourd" (Gilbert, Hays, Hellerman ...) — 2:09
 "When the Saints Go Marching In" (Traditional)  2:15
 "I've Got a Home in That Rock" (Gilbert, Hays, Hellerman) — 1:48
 "Hush Little Baby" (Campbell) — 1:03
 "Go Where I Send Thee (One for the Little Bitty Baby)" (Traditional, arranged by Gilbert, Hays, Hellerman) — 2:35
 "Goodnight, Irene" (Lead Belly, Lomax) — 4:02

Charts

Personnel

The Weavers
 Ronnie Gilbert - vocals (alto)
  Lee Hays - vocals (bass), arrangements
  Fred Hellerman - vocals (baritone), guitar
  Pete Seeger - vocals (tenor), arrangements, banjo

Other
 Nancy Toff - liner notes

Releases

References 

The Weavers albums
Albums recorded at Carnegie Hall
1957 live albums
Vanguard Records live albums